DXC Technology is an American multinational information technology (IT) services and consulting company headquartered in Ashburn, Virginia.

History
DXC Technology was founded on April 3, 2017 when the Hewlett Packard Enterprise Company (HPE) spun off its Enterprise Services business and merged it with Computer Sciences Corporation (CSC). At the time of its creation, DXC Technology had revenues of $25 billion, employed 170,000 people and operated in 70 countries.

The spinoff from Hewlett Packard Enterprise did not include two parts of the Enterprise Services segment: the Mphasis Limited reporting unit and the Communications and Media Solutions product group.

In India, the company started a three-year plan to reduce the number of offices in the country from 50 to 26, and reduce headcount by 5.9% (around 10,000) employees. With about 43,000 employees (more than a third of its workforce) in India, the company is restructuring its workforce to meet its new revenue profile.

In 2017, DXC split off its US public sector segment to create a new company, Perspecta Inc.

Mike Salvino, the former Accenture chief group executive, was named president and CEO of DXC Technology in 2019.

In February 2021, French technology services and consulting firm Atos ended talks for a potential acquisition of DXC. Atos had proposed for US$10 billion including debt for acquisition.

, DXC employed 134,000 in over 70 countries, including the United States, India, the Philippines, Central Europe and Vietnam.

Acquisitions

In July 2017, DXC purchased enterprise software company Tribridge and its affiliate company Concerto Cloud Services for $152 million.

In 2018, it announced additional acquisitions, including Molina Medicaid Solutions (previously part of Molina Healthcare), Argodesign and two ServiceNow partners, BusinessNow and TESM.

In January 2019, DXC Technology acquired Luxoft. According to information from the SEC database, DXC Technology then owned 83% of Luxoft. The deal closed in June 2019.

Programs and sponsorships

Dandelion Program
Piloted in Adelaide, Australia, in 2014, the DXC Dandelion Program has grown to over 100 employees in Australia, working with more than 240 organizations in 71 countries to acquire sustainable employment for individuals with autism. In June 2021, DXC piloted the Dandelion Program in the UK.

Sports
The company sponsored Team Penske with 2016 Series Champion and 2019 Indianapolis 500 winner Simon Pagenaud, and in 2018 became title sponsor of IndyCar Series race DXC Technology 600. DXC is also a partner of Australian Rugby Union team Brumbies. In 2022, the company became the new sleeve sponsor for English football club Manchester United.

See also 
 List of IT consulting firms

References

External links
 
 

 

American companies established in 2017
Companies based in Virginia
Technology companies established in 2017
Companies listed on the New York Stock Exchange
2017 establishments in Virginia
Information technology consulting firms of the United States
International information technology consulting firms